The Wright-Patterson Air Force Base Mound, designated 33GR31, is a Native American mound near the city of Dayton in Greene County, Ohio, United States.  Named for its location on an Air Force facility, Wright-Patterson Air Force Base, the mound is an archaeological site.

Pieces of limestone are present near the mound's surface; this may indicate that the builders covered it with limestone and that natural forces such as wind have since covered the stone with the soil that now forms the mound's surface.

In 1972, the mound was listed on the National Register of Historic Places because of its archaeological importance; it was the fourth Greene County location to be added to the Register, following Huffman Prairie and the two earthworks sites at Indian Mound Reserve near Cedarville.  While it has never been excavated, it was subjected to a range of geophysical survey methods in mid-1996.  Hoping to discover the locations of buried bodies and to learn about the soil within the mound, the surveyors used techniques such as ground-penetrating radar and found evidence of the mound's stratigraphy, as well as revealing evidence of unidentified features in and around it.  Future excavations, if conducted, are expected to increase knowledge of Adena death customs and daily life.

References

Adena culture
Archaeological sites on the National Register of Historic Places in Ohio
Buildings and structures in Greene County, Ohio
National Register of Historic Places in Greene County, Ohio
Wright-Patterson Air Force Base
Mounds in Ohio